Vitu may refer to:

Kenya
 Witu, a town on the Kenyan coast
 Witu Sultanate, a former sultanate on the Kenyan coast

New Guinea
 Vitu Islands, near New Guinea
 Vitu language